Texistepeque is a city and municipality in the Santa Ana department of western El Salvador. It lies in the center of the department, north of Santa Ana and south of Metapán. It was founded by the Poqomam Maya peoples and conquered by the Pipil people of Cuzcatlan until the Spanish conquest. The meaning of its name comes from Pipil Nawat language and means place of eggs or alternatively mountain of eggs; from Nawat teksis (eggs), and tepec or tepet (mountain) which indicates a place name.

History
The area around Texistepeque was originally populated by the Poqomam Maya and later fell under the dominion of the lords of Cuzcatlan until the Spanish conquest of El Salvador in the early 16th century. After El Salvador gained its independence from Spain in 1821, it formed part of the Sonsonate Department until that department was split between the newly formed Santa Ana department in 1855.

Church of Texistepeque 
The church is located in the city of the same name. It is located on the highway towards Metapán, 17 kilometers north of Santa Ana. It is not known who built it, but its edification probably dates back to the 18th century.

Its style is Baroque, with an altarpiece facade, divided in three bodies and decorated by half columns and semi-arched niches. The españada is finished off by scrolls and pinnacles, and crowned by a kind of tabernacle that houses a clock. The steeples are embedded on the facade and they are of a later construction. The lateral facades have supporting columns and are decorated with entablature. The current roof is of Iron sheets, but previously, it was built with wood and tiles.

The interior of the church is a wing containing ten wooden columns of a single trunk with stone bases almost 80 centimeters in height. Inside the church, the roof is wooden and the suspenders are what is conserved of the coffered Mudejar.

There are parochial registrations from the 18th century and data in the General Registration of Central America that say: “the community of the town of San Esteban-Texistepeque requests funds to finish the reconstruction of the town (year 1743)”. In 1755, they were given the fourth part of the tributes paid for the reconstruction of the temple.

Culture 
The patron saint of Texistepeque is Saint Stephen and festivals honoring this saint, are held from December 17 to December 27. Along with Saint Stephen, the virgin of Belen-Güijat is also celebrated. The town is famous for its Talcigüines, whip-bearing locals who, dressed as demons, whip residents on the streets at the beginning of Holy Week. This tradition reflects a mestizo origin of the city's people and culture, containing both Catholic Hispanic and Indigenous influences.

The local professional football club is named C.D. Titán and it currently plays in the Salvadoran Second Division.

Administration 
The total population of the municipality is 17,923 inhabitants. The incumbent mayor or alcalde as of 2018 is José Dimas Aguilar Mejía of the National Coalition Party (El Salvador). The municipality consists of six subdivisions called Cantones.

The six Cantones are:

 Canton Costa Rica
 Canton Cujucuyo
 Canton Chilcuyo
 Canton El Jute
 Canton San Miguel
 Canton Santo Tomás

The municipality is served by the Parish of San Esteban, Texistepeque.

Geography 
Texistepeque lies at 405 meters above sea level and has a territory of 178.97 km². The Lempa River passes through the eastern edge of the municipality and serves as a border between it and the Chalatenango Department.

References 

Municipalities of the Santa Ana Department